El Disco de Rebelde Way is a compilation album of the greatest hits by Argentine band Erreway. It was released exclusively in Spain in 2006. It sold 40,000 copies. The album consists of the greatest hits from the albums Señales and Tiempo and one DVD. Artists appearing on the album were Felipe Colombo, Camila Bordonaba, Benjamín Rojas and Luisana Lopilato.

The compilation was produced, created and directed by Cris Morena. Music and lyrics were made by Cris Morena, Silvio Furmansky, Gustavo Novello and Carlos Nilson, who worked with Erreway earlier. Once again, Warner Music was Erreway's label.

Track listing

Album
 "Tiempo"
 "Rebelde Way"
 "Será de Dios"
 "Bonita de Más"
 "Para Cosas Buenas"
 "Invento"
 "Sweet Baby"
 "Te Soñé"
 "Vas A Salvarte"
 "Inmortal"
 "Resistiré"
 "Será Porque Te Quiero"
 "Amor de Engaño"
 "Perder Un Amigo"
 "Dije Adiós"
 "Aún, Ahora'
 "Me Da Igual"
 "Que Estés"
 "Vamos Al Ruedo"

DVD
 "Para Cosas Buenas"
 "Será de Dios"
 "Vas A Salvarte"
 "Tiempo"
 "Que Estés"
 "Te Soñé"
 "Resistiré"
 "Será Porque Te Quiero"
 "Inmortal"
 "Sweet Baby"
 "Bonita de Más"

Charts

Weekly charts

Year-end charts

References

2006 greatest hits albums
Erreway albums
2006 video albums
Music video compilation albums